Aulostomoidei is a suborder of the order Syngnathiformes, which also contains groups such as the seahorses, pipefishes and dragonets.

Classification
There are two superfamilies within the Aulostomoidei and they are:

 Superfamily Aulostomoidea
 Family Aulostomidae (trumpetfishes)
 Family Fistularidae (cornetfishes)
 Superfamily Centriscoidea
 Family Macroramphosidae (snipefishes)
 Family Centriscidae (shrimpfishes)
 Family Dactylopteridae (flying gurnards)

Other authorities subsume the Aulostomoidea, as well as the Centriscidae (including Macroramphosus), into the "long-snouted clade" which makes up the suborder Syngnathoidei while placing the Dactylopteridae in the "benthic clade".

References

Syngnathiformes